Naan Avanillai ( I'm Not Him) is a 2007 Indian Tamil-language romantic thriller film directed by Selva. It is a remake of K. Balachander's classic movie with the same title, starring Gemini Ganesan, which was an adaptation of 1962 Marathi language play To Mee Navhech, written by Pralhad K. Atre and acted by Prabhakar Panshikar.

The film has Jeevan in the lead role and Sneha, Namitha, Malavika, Jyorthirmayi and Keerti Chawla as his five heroines. This movie created great expectations in the industry, because it was a hit when it was originally made in 1974. Shooting began in December 2006 and it was released in April 2007.  A sequel titled Naan Avanillai 2 was released on 27 November 2009. It was remade in Kannada in 2008 as Budhivanta with a change in the climax.

Plot
  
A wedding advertisement of leading businesswoman Monika with a gentleman brings up a flurry of girls to the police, each one of them claiming the young groom in the picture to be their husband. Puzzled at first, the police slowly realises that they are dealing with a clever and elaborate con artist and womaniser who impresses beautiful girls with elaborate bluffs to a quick marriage and escapes with their money/jewelry after sleeping with them. The police sends out a look out notice with the photo and the man is shown outsmarting the police narrowly on many tough situations, but once the bus he is in gets into an accident sending everyone on board unconscious, and he is inevitably picked up by the police from the hospital.

However the police soon realise that the guy is a tough nut to crack. He claims to be an innocent village simpleton named Annamalai with no connection to any of the cases dumped on him. They also realise that he has left no solid evidences around any of his conjobs that could be traced to his flesh and blood. To all the charges against him the cool, smooth-talking, and confident Annamalai has only one constant answer - "Naan Avanillai" (I am not him). Monika is shocked but refuses to believe that her lover could be the conman that the police make out. Produced before the court, he adopts the brilliant tactic of not denying the reality of any of the conjobs but just that he is not the man - "Naan Avanillai" (I am not him), leaving even the Judge Sharada in a fix. The principal complainants are three women - Rekha, Ammukutty Menon, and Rani - all of whom recollect their encounters with the guy in court.

Rekha is pursuing a modelling career when she picks up a cell phone on the way to get a call from its owner, a young man who calls himself Vignesh. He introduces himself as a millionaire businessman based in London who flies the world on a regular basis and has all influential connections, and Rekha soon falls head over heels over him when he offers to promote her dream acting career. Even her businessman brother Thyagu falls for his charms when he hands over 25 lakhs to bribe a minister in order to approve a tender of Thyagu's. The impressed brother-sister duo proposes marriage to Vignesh, which he readily accepts. When Vignesh says that his mother in London has fixed a billionaire foreigner for his wife, which shall happen as soon as he returns to London, Thyagu offers to conduct Rekha's marriage with him the very next day so that Rekha could go with him as his wife and convince his family. Thus, the marriage happens in the auspices of Rekha's family with nobody on part of Vignesh present. Vignesh and Rekha consummate their marriage at a resort of her family friend's offering, but Rekha wakes up in the morning to see Vignesh missing. She has not heard from him ever since.

Ammukutty is a young scion of the Cochin royal family who has to deal with an unpleasant fiancée at home when she meets a young man apparently by chance on the road who claims to be Madhavan Menon from Thrissur. She easily falls for his charms and later gets to hear from a call on his cell phone that he is actually a scion of the Travancore royal family and is out from home to escape a marriage he does not like. Impressed, she proposes him and plans to elope on the day of her marriage. Madhavan enters the ceremony in the guise of the officiating priest and cleverly manages to run away with her. As he cannot go to his own family as per his story, they settle anonymously at Trivandrum and consummate their marriage. At the end of the day when Madhavan gets a call from Napoleon reminding him of a deadline to pay some 10 lakhs regarding his business, Ammukutty readily offers her jewelry, which Madhavan reluctantly accepts and leaves. She has not heard from him since.

Chandra was a naïve godwoman who ran a spiritual ashram with her young daughter Rani when Hariharan Das turns up as a young spiritual master from some superior ashram in the Himalayas. He soon convinces everyone that he is an incarnation of Lord Krishna himself while Rani is an incarnation of none other than the divine Radha. Their marriage is soon arranged, and they consummate the marriage in a form in an extended rasaleela. Soon, he escapes with all the ashram jewelry during a supposed miracle show.

Monika is a billionaire businesswoman and a divorcee who happens to hire a young man who calls himself Shyam Prasad as her marketing manager. Lonely longing for love and trying to escape her impotent ex-husband, she easily falls for Shyam's charms, and the adept Shyam soon enters her bed even without any pretense of a marriage. She is still head over heels in love with her hero after all the bad news has come out.

Throughout the court proceedings, Annamalai defends his case brilliantly by repeatedly pinpointing that every one of the crimes narrated by the women could be true and the person who committed it might look like himself, but it just happens that he is not the man - "Naan Avanillai" (I am not him). The police even trace his associate "Napoleon" who is actually Alex Thambidurai. However this turns useless as "Annamalai" resorts to his usual "Naan Avanillai" and Thambidurai too cannot bring any evidence to pin the man in flesh and blood. Sharada is forced to concede that there is no solid evidence establishing the same.

The DYSP, the investigation officer, is frustrated that he cannot pin the person he has to any of the crimes committed with solid evidence. He sees a ray of hope when David Fernandes appears, claiming to be the guy's elder brother. As narrated by him, "Annamalai" is actually Joseph Fernandez, an intelligent student who, due to bad influences, takes the easy way out by becoming a fraud and trickster. "Annamalai" denies this too, as usual - "Naan Avanillai." The DySP arranges a DNA cross match with David to establish that the guy is his sibling. However, his hopes are shattered when the DNA test returns a negative answer. It is soon revealed that it was Monika who tampered with the DNA cross match, ready to go to any crazy extend to save her guy from the clutches of the law.

Meanwhile, Sharada's own daughter Anjali is surprised at the developments as she too had been conned by the man, but only of some money, faking a painting by posing as an acclaimed artist Zakir Hussain. A law student herself, Anjali quite clearly sees through "Annamalai"'s schemes but is impressed by his brilliant performance in court, and like Monika, wishes him to be acquitted.

At the end of the hearing, Justice Sharada is inevitably forced to acquit "Annamalai" for lack of evidence, but the girls he cheated are waiting with drawn daggers for him. While he escapes all four of the present, another lady in a saree gets him in the heart. She reveals herself to the DySP as yet another woman who was cheated. The scene ends with Annamalai going down, making a cross with Jesus' name on his lips, but the movie end cutting short to the same person in a totally different appearance bluffing his way to a Caucasian girl in a foreign background.

Cast

Production
Naan Avanillai is a remake of the 1974 film of the same name. It was also the "first acknowledged remake of an earlier Tamil film".

Release 
The film was released on 20 April 2007. Sify called it "technically far superior to the 1976 movie made by KB, but the modern remake lacks the bite of the original .Still it is worth a look, for its racy narration." Behindwoods wrote "All in all, a commercial entertainer that is close to flawlessly scripted and neatly executed." Indiaglitz wrote "Selvah has managed to churn out an engrosser with right twists and turns in the remake version. What more it is very trendy, chic and modern."

Soundtrack
The soundtracks were composed by Vijay Antony and D. Imman. The song "Radha Kadhal" is the remake of the song "Radha Kadhal Varadha" from the original film. It was nominated for  2007 Filmfare Awards. The song "Aen Ennaku Mayakkam" was reused in Mahatma as "Em Jaruguthondi".

Sequel 

A sequel named Naan Avanillai 2 was released on 27 November 2009.

References

External links

Remakes of Indian films
2007 films
2000s Tamil-language films
Indian thriller films
Reboot films
Films scored by Vijay Antony
Films directed by Selva (director)
2007 drama films